Dacheng Tao  is an engineer from the University of Sydney, Australia. He received a PhD in 2007 from the University of London under Stephen Maybank, with a thesis titled Discriminative linear and multilinear subspace methods. He was named a Fellow of the Institute of Electrical and Electronics Engineers (IEEE) in 2015 for his contributions to pattern recognition and visual analytics.
He was awarded an Australian Laureate Fellowship in 2017.
In 2018, Tao was also elected a Fellow of the Australian Academy of Science (FAA) for his "ground-breaking contributions in artificial intelligence, computer vision image processing and machine learning.
He was elected as an ACM Fellow in 2019 "for contributions to representation learning and its applications".  He was selected to the Global Young Academy. Tao won the Australian Museum's Eureka Prize for Excellence in Data Science in 2020. He has written over 1200 publications across various Artificial Intelligence fields, including pattern recognition, visual analytics, and statistical learning theory.

References 

Fellow Members of the IEEE
Fellows of the Association for Computing Machinery
1978 births
Living people
Australian computer scientists
Australian people of Chinese descent
University of Science and Technology of China alumni
Alumni of the Chinese University of Hong Kong
Alumni of Birkbeck, University of London
Academic staff of Hong Kong Polytechnic University
Academic staff of the University of Technology Sydney
Academic staff of Nanyang Technological University
Academic staff of the University of Sydney
Fellows of the Australian Academy of Science